Josh Reese (born January 3, 1991) is an American football wide receiver who is currently a free agent. He played college football at UCF.

Professional career

Tampa Bay Buccaneers

Reese was signed as an undrafted rookie on May 5, 2015. He was later cut in rookie minicamp on May 11, 2015.

Philadelphia Eagles

Reese was signed as a rookie free agent on August 4, 2015.

Washington Valor
Reese was assigned to the Washington Valor. On May 24, 2017, Reese was activated by the Valor. On June 29, 2017, Reese was placed on reassignment. On July 8, 2017, Reese was assigned to the Valor.

References

External links
UCF Knights bio

American football wide receivers
UCF Knights football players
Philadelphia Eagles players
1991 births
Living people
Washington Valor players